Zhaksy District is a district of Aqmola Region in northern Kazakhstan. The administrative center of the district is the settlement of Zhaksy. Population:

History
The district was established in 1957, originally named Kiiminsky (since 1964 — Zhaksynsky). From 1970 to 1997, it was part of the Turgay region.

Geographical characteristics
The total land area is  969 264 hectares. The district is located in the Central part of the region and borders with Sandyktau, Zharkain, Atbasar, Esil districts of Akmola region.

Climate conditions
The climate is sharply continental: hot in summer, harsh in winter, the duration of the frost-free period is 115-120 days. In terms of air purification and the quality of water consumed, the district is relatively prosperous. Sources of air pollution are industrial enterprises, boilers and vehicles, but these emissions are not a threat to the environment.

Education
There are 21 schools in the district, including 16 high schools, 4 secondary schools, 1 primary school, and 3 additional education facilities.

Minerals
There are some deposits of construction materials in the district. Among which there are currently deposits of crushed stone, gravel, rubble stone, construction sand and clay for the production of bricks of the "150" brand, loam for bricks of the "150" and "200" brand.

Administrative arrangement
The district has 7 rural districts, 7 villages, and 25 localities.

References

Districts of Kazakhstan
Akmola Region